Veronica Mallett is an American physician and the former dean of Meharry Medical College. Currently she serves System SVP and Chief Administrative Officer CommonSpirit Health/Morehouse School of Medicine More in Common Alliance (MICA) and board director Sharecare corporation https://moreincommonalliance.org/news/recognized-leader-in-health-disparities-veronica-mallett-m-d-to-join-more-in-common-alliance. Prior to this role she held the position of President and CEO of Meharry Medical College Ventures, the holding company for Meharry Medical College. https://www.bizjournals.com/nashville/news/2022/02/07/the-boss-dr-veronica-mallett.html She is an expert in urogynecology and a pioneer for the medical profession.

Early life
Mallett is the youngest child of Conrad and Claudia Mallett. Born and raised in Detroit she graduate with honors from Cass Technical High School. Mallett graduated from Barnard College in 1979 and Michigan State University College of Human Medicine in 1983. Following medical school she completed her graduate medical education training in Obstetrics and Gynecology. In 2011,she obtained her Masters in Medical Management from Carnegie Melon University. 
She spent the first years of her career at Northwestern University School of Medicine and then returned to Detroit for fellowship training in Urogynecology (Female Pelvic Medicine and Reconstructive Pelvic Surgery from Wayne State University College of Medicine.

References

1961 births
Living people
African-American physicians
American urologists
Barnard College alumni
Michigan State University alumni
21st-century African-American people
20th-century African-American people
https://barnard.edu/magazine/winter-new/setting-standard-care